Eunota gabbii (or Eunota gabbi), the western tidal flat tiger beetle, is a species of flashy tiger beetle in the family Cicindelidae. It was formerly known as Cicindela gabbii and Habroscelimorpha gabbii.

References

Further reading

 
 
 
 
 

Cicindelidae
Beetles described in 1866